Joel Farabee (born February 25, 2000) is an American professional ice hockey left winger currently playing for the  Philadelphia Flyers of the National Hockey League (NHL). Farabee was drafted in the first round, 14th overall at the 2018 NHL Entry Draft by the Flyers.

Growing up in Cicero, New York, Farabee competed with the Syracuse Nationals, Buffalo Jr Sabres, and Selects Hockey Academy at South Kent School. He joined the USA Hockey National Team Development Program in the United States Hockey League (USHL) before committing to play NCAA Division I ice hockey with the Boston University Terriers men's ice hockey team. During his time in college, Farabee tied for second in goals and third in points amongst rookies while leading the Terriers in goals, points, power-play goals, shorthanded goals, game-winning goals, plus-minus, and shots. In recognition of his efforts, Farabee received the Tim Taylor Award as college hockey's Rookie of the Year, Hockey East Rookie of the Year, and was selected for the Hockey East All-Rookie Team.

Farabee concluded his collegiate career on March 25, 2019, by signing an entry-level contract with the Flyers and was reassigned to the Lehigh Valley Phantoms to begin the season. He made his NHL debut on October 21, 2019, subsequently becoming the first Flyers player to be born in the 2000s. By the conclusion of the shortened 2019–20 regular season, Farabee recorded 21 points through 52 games.

Personal life
Farabee was born on February 25, 2000, to business owner Dave and nursing supervisor Pam Farabee in Cicero, New York, the youngest of three boys. Farabee credits his older brothers Jake and Jesse for inspiring his love of hockey saying, "I always watched them. They were on older teams. They inspired me to want to get to that level." He also credited his grandfather as being a role model for him growing up. Farabee's grandfather Joe Klodzen was drafted by the St. Louis Cardinals of Major League Baseball who, while never making the major league roster, competed in their minor league system. As his father was born and raised in Philadelphia, Farabee grew up a fan of Philly sports teams including the Philadelphia Eagles.

Playing career

Amateur 
As a child, Farabee competed with the Syracuse Nationals at the Bell Capital Cup in Ottawa before playing above his year level with the Buffalo Jr Sabres at the Quebec International Pee-Wee Hockey Tournament. During the Bell Capital Cup, he led the team with six goals and one power play point. In the ninth grade, when Farabee was recruited to play junior hockey in the Selects Hockey Academy at South Kent School, his family began taking his future career in hockey seriously. He played on the SASKS U16 National team before joining the USA Hockey National Team Development Program and competing in the United States Hockey League (USHL). Farabee was chosen to captain the team in his second year by coach Seth Appert as a result of his "competitive, all-around game that belies his size." Although originally committing to play NCAA Division I ice hockey with the University of New Hampshire, he changed his commitment to Boston University of Hockey East in 2015.

Farabee played one season with the Boston University Terriers men's ice hockey team, recording 36 points in 37 games. He praised his time with the Terriers, saying, "I think my down-low, below-the-goal-line game has gotten a lot better than it was a year ago...As far as protecting the puck and holding onto it and not making plays too fast to where I turn it over. That’s the big thing at the highest levels. That’s why college hockey was so good for me." He finished the 2018–19 season tied for second in goals and third in points amongst rookies while leading the Terriers in goals, points, power-play goals, shorthanded goals, game-winning goals, plus-minus, and shots. In recognition of his efforts, Farabee received the Tim Taylor Award as college hockey's Rookie of the Year, Hockey East Rookie of the Year, and was selected for the Hockey East All-Rookie Team.

Leading up to the 2018 NHL Entry Draft, Farabee was ranked 12th amongst all North American skaters by the NHL Central Scouting Bureau. However, through showing his offensive prowess as team captain in the Development Program and at Boston University, Farabee was selected in the first round, 14th overall, by the Philadelphia Flyers in the 2018 NHL Entry Draft on June 23, 2018. Speaking afterwards, Farabee said he was hoping to be drafted by Philadelphia because he was a fan of the Flyers growing up.

Professional
Farabee signed an entry-level contract with the Philadelphia Flyers on March 25, 2019, after his freshman season at Boston University. After being a healthy scratch during the Flyers' season opener in Prague, he was reassigned to their American Hockey League (AHL) affiliate, the Lehigh Valley Phantoms, to begin the season. He played four games with the Phantoms, recording three goals and one assist, before being recalled to the NHL for his debut. When reflecting on his early time in the professional league, Farabee said it helped him gain more confidence and comfortable with his stickhandling. As a result of his play, Farabee was honored as PSECU Player of the Week.

Upon making his NHL debut with the Flyers on October 21, 2019, against the Vegas Golden Knights, Farabee subsequently became the first Flyers player in franchise history to be born in the 2000s. Four days later, Farabee scored his first career NHL goal and assist against the Chicago Blackhawks but both were overturned due to teammate Kevin Hayes being offside. He officially earned his first NHL point later that game as an assist on Hayes’ third-period goal. It was not until the following month, however, that Farabee would record his first official goal in a 4–3 shootout win against the New Jersey Devils. Upon receiving a rebound from Michael Raffl, Farabee said he "closed his eyes" before shooting the puck into the net. Farabee remained with the Flyers before being suspended three games for interference during a contest against the Winnipeg Jets on December 15.

After playing in 37 games with the Flyers, recording three goals and nine assists, Farabee was loaned to the Phantoms on January 15, 2020. He was recalled periodically throughout the second half of the season as a replacement for injured players, including James van Riemsdyk. By the conclusion of the shortened 2019–20 regular season, Farabee recorded 21 points through 52 games. During the 2020 Stanley Cup playoffs he recorded his first goal during the Round-Robin against the Tampa Bay Lightning, becoming the first NHL player born in the 2000s to score a postseason goal. As the Flyers beat the Lightning, he scored the game-winning goal against the Montreal Canadiens in Game 1 of the Eastern Conference First Round Playoffs. After playing well following his jump to the first line in the round-robin finale with Jakub Voráček (undisclosed issue) out, Farabee stayed with Claude Giroux and Sean Couturier in Game 1. He remained with the team during their playoff berth as they lost in the Eastern Conference Second Round against the New York Islanders. During the series, Farabee suffered a hit to the head and neck from Adam Pelech in Game 5 and was forced to sit out for the two remaining games to recover.

Farabee returned to the Flyers' training camp for the 2020–21 season having gained nine pounds and stating he felt "a lot more confident." He made his season debut on January 13 against the Pittsburgh Penguins, during which he tied a franchise record for most points in a season-opener by scoring four points in the 6–3 win. Later that month, Farabee scored his first NHL hat trick in a 4–3 overtime win against the Islanders, becoming the second youngest Flyers player to achieve this feat during the regular season. He finished the season with 20 goals and 18 assists for a career high 38 points. As such, Farabee was awarded the Pelle Lindbergh Memorial Trophy, given to the most improved Flyer as voted by his teammates.

Following his career-best season, Farabee signed a six-year, $30 million contract extension with the Flyers on September 2, 2021. With the offseason acquisition of Cam Atkinson, Farabee began the season on a high-scoring line alongside him and Derick Brassard. However, after experiencing a pointless drought through eight games, Farabee was placed on a line with Scott Laughton for a game against the Carolina Hurricanes.

Playing style
Farabee says he models his playing style after Pittsburgh Penguins forward Jake Guentzel. The comparisons were focused on their skating ability, playmaking, and hockey IQ. He has also drawn comparisons to Brad Marchand and Zach Parise due to his "high motor and a good deal of intensity." During the Flyers' training camp in 2019, teammate Jakub Voráček called him a "smart player" who was hard to catch up with.

International play

Farabee has represented the United States at various international competitions at the junior level. His first time representing the United States internationally was at the 2017 IIHF World U18 Championships in Slovakia. He played in seven games, recording six points, as the team went on to win a gold medal. The following year, Farabee competed at the 2018 IIHF World U18 Championships, where he recorded four goals and four assists for eight points in seven games to lead the team to a silver medal.

Farabee was named to the 2019 World Junior Ice Hockey Championships team for the United States men's national junior ice hockey team. During a game against Kazakhstan on December 28, 2018, Farabee recorded a natural hat-trick in the first period to lead the United States to an 8–2 win. He ended the tournament with five points in seven games as the United States won another silver medal.

Career statistics

Regular season and playoffs

International

Awards and honors

References

External links
 

2000 births
Living people
American men's ice hockey left wingers
Boston University Terriers men's ice hockey players
Ice hockey players from New York (state)
Lehigh Valley Phantoms players
National Hockey League first-round draft picks
People from Cicero, New York
Philadelphia Flyers draft picks
Philadelphia Flyers players
USA Hockey National Team Development Program players